Eocarcharia (meaning "dawn shark") is a genus of carcharodontosaurid theropod dinosaur from the Early Cretaceous Elrhaz Formation that lived in the Sahara 112 million years ago, in what today is the country of Niger. It was discovered in 2000 on an expedition led by University of Chicago paleontologist Paul Sereno. The type and only species is Eocarcharia dinops. Its teeth were shaped like blades and were used for disabling live prey and ripping apart body parts. Eocarcharia’s brow is swollen into a massive band of bone, giving it a menacing glare (leading to the specific name dinops or "fierce-eyed").

Paleoecology
In the Elrhaz Formation, dinosaurs that lived with Eocarcharia include theropods Kryptops palaios and Suchomimus tenerensis, sauropod Nigersaurus taqueti, and ornithopods Ouranosaurus nigeriensis, Lurdusaurus arenatus, and Elrhazosaurus nigeriensis.

References

External links 
 Project Exploration
 BBC's The World GeoQuiz 15 February 2008

Carcharodontosaurids
Early Cretaceous dinosaurs of Africa
Aptian life
Cretaceous Niger
Fossils of Niger
Fossil taxa described in 2008
Taxa named by Paul Sereno